The average life expectancy in Trinidad and Tobago at birth was 70 years, and  “healthy” life expectancy 61 years in 2015.

About 9% of the population have diabetes.  The number of obese primary school children increased from around 11% in 1999 to 23% in 2009.   Deaths from tuberculosis declined from 2.1 per 100,000 population in 2010 to 1.1 in 2015.

See also: Healthcare in Trinidad and Tobago

See also
Healthcare in Trinidad and Tobago

References